Lü Bin (born January 7, 1977) is a former female freestyle and medley swimmer from China. Her best performance was winning the silver medal in the 4×100 m freestyle at the 1992 Summer Olympics in Barcelona, Spain.

References
 sports-reference, Lu Bin bio

1977 births
Living people
Chinese female freestyle swimmers
Chinese female medley swimmers
Olympic swimmers of China
Swimmers at the 1992 Summer Olympics
Olympic silver medalists for China
World record setters in swimming
World Aquatics Championships medalists in swimming
Medalists at the FINA World Swimming Championships (25 m)
Medalists at the 1992 Summer Olympics
Olympic silver medalists in swimming
Swimmers at the 1994 Asian Games
Asian Games competitors for China
20th-century Chinese women